The steamship Virginia V is one of two last operational examples of Puget Sound Mosquito Fleet steamers.  She was once part of a large fleet of small passenger and freight carrying ships that linked the islands and ports of Puget Sound in Washington state in the late 19th and early 20th centuries.  She is a Seattle landmark and a National Historic Landmark.

Her original route was between the cities of Tacoma and Seattle, along the West Pass (also known as Colvos Passage) between Vashon Island and the Kitsap Peninsula.

Today the ship operates from Heritage Wharf at Lake Union Park in Seattle.

History

West Pass Transportation Company 

Around the turn of the 20th century outlying communities all over Puget Sound, particularly those on the many islands, were dependent on small boats and ships for delivering goods and basic transportation.  The primary shipping lane from Seattle to Tacoma was along the east side of Vashon Island.

Farmers and business people along Colvos Passage in Kitsap County and on the west side of Vashon Island were very dissatisfied with the unreliable boat service they received.  In 1910 Captain Nelse "Nels" Christensen and John Holm formed the West Pass Transportation Company and purchased their own boat to serve this part of the island.

She was renamed simply Virginia and converted for use as a small ferry.

The Virginia boats 

In 1914 the West Pass Transportation Company purchased the  steam ship Typhoon and renamed her Virginia III. In 1918 they purchased the  steam ship Tyrus, and in 1920 they renamed her Virginia IV and put her on the West Pass route.

Construction of Virginia V 

In 1921, Anderson & Company of Maplewood, Washington, began construction of Virginia V.  The ship was built of local old-growth fir.  She was launched 9 March 1922, and towed to downtown Seattle for the installation of her engine and steam plant.  In Seattle the engine was removed from Virginia IV and installed in Virginia V. On 11 June 1922, Virginia V made her maiden voyage from Elliott Bay in Seattle to Tacoma down the West Pass.  She continued to make this voyage nearly every day until 1938.

Storm of 1934 

On 21 October 1934, a severe Pacific storm swept through the Puget Sound.  Virginia V was attempting to dock at Olalla, Washington, when the brunt of the storm hit.  The powerful winds pushed the ship against the dock as the waves pounded the ship into the pilings.  The result was the near destruction of the upper decks. The ship was re-built at the Lake Washington Shipyard at Houghton, near modern-day Kirkland, Washington.  She was returned to service on 5 December 1934.

Camp Sealth and the Camp Fire Girls 

Each summer from 1922 to 1970 (with a few interruptions around World War II) Virginia V carried girls to and from Seattle to Camp Sealth on Vashon Island for the Camp Fire Girls.  Thousands of women in the Northwest recall a ride on Virginia Vee (as she was affectionately called) as the beginning of a camping adventure.

Columbia River service and bankruptcy 
The West Pass Transportation Company went out of business in 1942.  Virginia V, which had been operating for a while on the Seattle-Fort Worden run, was transferred to the Columbia River, where for a brief time she was placed on the Portland-Astoria run, thus becoming the last scheduled passenger vessel running on both Puget Sound and the Columbia River.  Her Columbia River career was unsuccessful.  Her owners were unable to pay her crew and she was libeled (legally seized for debts owed) and sold at Vancouver, Washington by the U.S. Marshals to pay her owner's debts. Virginia V was purchased by O.H. "Doc" Freeman and Joe Boles of Seattle.  They resold the vessel to Jack Katz and Captain Howell Parker less than a year later.

Captain Howell Parker and The Great Steamboat Race 

Captain Parker operated Virginia V carrying war workers between Poulsbo, Washington, and the Keyport Naval Torpedo Station with his wife Mary as steward and purser.  After the end of World War II, the Parkers continued to operate her as an excursion vessel all around Puget Sound.  In 1948 the Puget Sound Maritime Historical Society (PSMHS) was formed to preserve the Northwest's marine history.  As a publicity event, the PSMHS sponsored a race between Virginia V and a similar ship, Grayline Sightseer (formerly Vashona) to be held on National Maritime Day.  The Great Steamboat Race began on May 22 at 2PM.  At the end of a  course that ran across the Seattle waterfront, Virginia V won the race by a small margin.

Puget Sound Excursion Lines 

In 1954 Virginia V was sold to Captain Phillip Luther of Puget Sound Excursion Lines.  Captain Luther sold her to Charles McMahon in 1956.  McMahon extensively refurbished Virginia V, and then continued to operate her as a commercial excursion vessel around Puget Sound.  In 1958 James F. "Cy" Devenny purchased controlling interest in Puget Sound Excursion Company and took over operation of Virginia V along with several other small vessels.  Among these was the McNeil Island federal prison tender J.E. Overlade (ex Arcadia), built in 1928, herself one of the last survivors of the Mosquito Fleet.  Devenny renamed her Virginia VI to match her more famous running mate.

Northwest Steamship Company 
In 1968 a group of steamboat enthusiasts formed the Northwest Steamship Company, and raised the funds to buy Virginia V from Puget Sound Excursion Company. The ship was placed on the National Registry of Historic Sites in 1973,  but despite her recognition as historically significant, it was increasingly difficult for her owners to maintain her as a commercial venture.

Steamer Virginia V Foundation 

In 1976 the non-profit Steamer Virginia V Foundation was formed to preserve Virginia V.  The Foundation acquired her on 30 September 1980, for $127,000.

Major restoration 1995-2001 

In 2002, the Foundation was able to put Virginia V back in service after a six-year, $6.5 million stem-to-stern restoration project. It included a rebuild of the steam engine, construction of a new boiler and rebuild of the superstructure using traditional tongue and groove fir planking.  The Foundation was honored in 2001 with the Washington State Historical Society's "David Douglas Award" for the restoration work completed to-date.

Present day 
Since 2002 the Virginia V has been providing public excursions, private charters, and visits to local maritime festivals throughout Puget Sound.

Engine and boiler

The triple-expansion, double-acting, reciprocating steam engine is the original, installed in 1922 when it was taken from Virginia IV (formerly Tyrus).  The parts were cast in 1904 at the Heffernan Engine Works in downtown Seattle as one of two identical engines built for the Army.  The first engine was assembled and installed in the US Army Quartermaster Steamer Evan Thomas.   Virginia Vs engine was assembled and installed in Tyrus in 1907.

Indicated Horsepower: 
Maximum RPM: Approximately 200
Stroke: 

The original Stoddert oil-fired, water-tube boiler was replaced in 2000 with a new Babcock & Wilcox oil-fired water-tube boiler of similar configuration.

Virginia V always used oil as her fuel.  The ship originally burned heavy bunker fuel.  She was converted to burn #2 Diesel fuel in 2002.

In recent years, the engine has developed a noise, referred to as "The Squeak". While the cause of this noise is not definitively known, it is presumed to come from the low pressure valve. There are no physical indications of scuffing, galling, or damage to components indicating a metal-to-metal contact. The squeak is more pronounced as the engine warms up, and goes away as the engine speed increases. The problem has so vexed the engineers that they have started a tongue-in-cheek fund, whereby visitors are required to donate $1 to the repair fund if they wish to talk to an engineer about it. (This fund may also be diverted to a beer fund, at the discretion of the engineer.)
Working Pressure: 
Fuel: #2 Diesel Oil

See also 
Historic preservation
List of National Historic Landmarks in Washington (state)
List of U.S. National Historic Landmark ships, shipwrecks, and shipyards
List of Puget Sound steamboats

References

M.S. Kline, Steamboat Virginia V (Documentary Book Publishers Corp., 1985)
Roland Carey, The Sound of Steamers (Alderbrook Publishing Co., 1965)
Roland Carey, The Sound And The Mountain (Alderbrook Publishing Co., 1970)
Gordon R. Newell, Ships of the Inland Sea (Binford & Mort, Publishers, 1960)	
Jim Faber, Steamer’s Wake (Enetai Press, 1985)

External links

Historic images from on-line collections of the University of Washington
Virginia V
Captains Harry Wilson of Sightseer and Howell Parker of Virginia V preparing for the great steamboat race of 1948
May Parker and Capt. Howell Parker on his birthday

Websites

The Steamship Virginia V Web Site
The National Park Service’s Maritime Heritage Program Virginia V Page
HistoryLink Online Encyclopedia of Washington State History

Historic American Engineering Record in Washington (state)
Museum ships in Washington (state)
Museums in Seattle
National Historic Landmarks in Washington (state)
National Register of Historic Places in Seattle
Propeller-driven steamboats of Washington (state)
Ships on the National Register of Historic Places in Washington (state)
Steamboats of the Columbia River
Steamboats of Oregon
Steamboats of Washington (state)
Steamships
South Lake Union, Seattle
1922 ships